Neomordellistena variabilis is a beetle in the genus Neomordellistena of the family Mordellidae. It was described in 1931 by Píc.

References

variabilis
Beetles described in 1931